The state of affairs is the combination of circumstances applying within a society or group at a particular time. The current state of affairs may be considered acceptable by many observers, but not necessarily by all. The state of affairs may present a challenge, or be complicated, or contain a conflict of interest. The status quo represents the existing state of affairs. Unresolved difficulties or disagreements concerning the state of affairs can provoke a crisis. Dispute resolution is naturally desired, and naturally provided, by forms of inclusive social interaction, such as consensus decision-making, which adapt, but not conveniently,  from a family or tribal model to encompass a global scope.
Current knowledge and discussion about the state of affairs is communicated through the media.

See also
 De facto
 Fact
 Possible world
 The powers that be

External links
States of Affairs at Stanford Encyclopedia of Philosophy

Social concepts